Marcos Felipe de Freitas Monteiro (born 13 April 1996), known as Marcos Felipe, is a Brazilian professional footballer who plays as a goalkeeper for Bahia, on loan from Fluminense.

References

External links

1996 births
Living people
Sportspeople from Espírito Santo
Brazilian footballers
Association football goalkeepers
Campeonato Brasileiro Série A players
Campeonato Brasileiro Série B players
Fluminense FC players
Macaé Esporte Futebol Clube players
Esporte Clube Bahia players
Brazil youth international footballers
Brazil under-20 international footballers